Rubén Acosta Montoya (born 2 December 1973) is a Mexican politician and lawyer affiliated with the PVEM. He currently serves as Deputy of the LXII Legislature of the Mexican Congress representing Chihuahua.

References

1973 births
Living people
People from Ciudad Juárez
21st-century Mexican lawyers
Members of the Chamber of Deputies (Mexico) for Chihuahua (state)
Ecologist Green Party of Mexico politicians
21st-century Mexican politicians
Monterrey Institute of Technology and Higher Education alumni
Politicians from Chihuahua (state)
Deputies of the LXII Legislature of Mexico